Klaus Schilde (born September 12, 1926; died December 11, 2020) was a German pianist and violinist who has made numerous recordings, radio and TV broadcasts and produced 100 Henle urtext editions of fingerings.

Biography
Schilde was born in Dresden, Germany, and played piano and violin from his childhood. He was influenced by Walter Engel who gave him piano lessons. From 1946 to 1948 he attended Leipzig Conservatory where he studied with Hugo Steurer and in 1952 he moved to Paris where he studied with Nadia Boulanger, Lucette Descaves, Walter Gieseking and Edwin Fischer, and Marguerite Long. During the Cold War he taught in such places as Tokyo, Japan, and both parts of Berlin as well as Munich; in the latter, he became a professor and then President of the Staatliche Hochschule für Musik und Theater. There, he served from 1988 to 1991.

References

1926 births
2020 deaths
German pianists
German violinists
German male violinists
Musicians from Dresden
University of Music and Theatre Leipzig alumni
German male pianists